Georges Samson Denola (29 August 1865, Paris, France – 3 March 1944, Neuilly-sur-Seine, France) was a French filmmaker and actor. His most notable film is La Jeunesse de Rocambole, released in 1913. As an actor, Georges Denola has been seen in L'Hirondelle et la Mésange (1920) and in La Fin du jour, released in 1939.

Filmography (as director) 
 1908: Le Coup de fusil, short subject
 1908: Charlotte Corday
 1909: Chercheurs d'or
 1910: Zizi la bouquetière
 1910: Voleur d'amour
 1910: Un homme habile
 1910: Une gentille petite femme (Une petite femme bien douce)
 1910: Le Gendarme sauve le voleur (Le Trimardeur)
 1910: La Tournée du percepteur
 1910: L'Une pour l'autre (Sœurs de lait)
 1910: Le Revenant
 1910: Les Larmes de l'enfant (Le Retour au foyer)
 1910: Le Rendez-vous
 1910: Promenade d'amour
 1910: Pour les beaux yeux de la voisine
 1910: Une heure d'oubli (La Pigeonne)
 1910: Par un jour de carnaval
 1910: Loin des yeux, loin du cœur
 1910: L'Illusion (L'Illusion des yeux)
 1910: L'Accident (L'Heureux accident)
 1910: Fleur des maquis
 1910: Les Fiancés de Colombine
 1910: La Fête de Marguerite
 1910: La Femme du saltimbanque
 1910: La Faute du notaire
 1910: L'Évasion de Vidocq
 1910: Deux petits Jésus
 1910: Au temps des grisettes
 1910: Amour de page
 1911: La Vénus d'Arles
 1911: Une femme trop aimante
 1911: Souris d'hôtel
 1911: À qui l'héritière? (La Ruse de Miss Plumcake)
 1911: Romain Kalbris
 1911: Le Remords du juge
 1911: Le Pot de confitures
 1911: Philémon et Baucis
 1911: Oiseau de printemps, hirondelle d'hiver
 1911: Frisette, blanchisseuse de fin (La Note de la blanchisseuse)
 1911: Galathée (Moderne Galathée)
 1911: Mimi Pinson
 1911: Fatale rencontre (La Lettre inachevée)
 1911: L'Homme au grand manteau
 1911: La Gouvernante
 1911: La Fille du clown
 1911: La Clémence d'Isabeau, princesse d'Héristal
 1911: Le Chef d'œuvre
 1911: La Tournée du docteur (Le Cabriolet du docteur)
 1911: Les Bottes de Kouba
 1911: La Bonté de Jacques V
 1911: La Servante (La Bonne à tout faire)
 1911: Bonaparte et Pichegru - 1804 (Bonaparte et Pichegru)
 1911: L'Anniversaire de Mademoiselle Félicité
 1911: L'Abîme
 1912: La Voleuse d'enfants
 1912: Sa majesté Grippemiche
 1912: Le Fabricant d'automates (La Poupée tyrolienne)
 1912: Un grand amour (Pianiste par amour)
 1912: La Moche
 1912: L'Heure du berger
 1912: La Folle de Pen-March (La Folle de Penmarch)
 1912: Les Enfants perdus dans la forêt
 1912: La Dernière aventure du prince Curaçao
 1912: Toto jaloux (Le Crime de Toto)
 1912: Le Cœur des pauvres
 1912: Le Chercheur de truffes
 1912: L'Auberge du tohu-bohu
 1912: La Vengeance de Licinius
 1912: Pauvre père
 1912: La Porteuse de pain
 1912: La Petite fonctionnaire
 1913: La Jeunesse de Rocambole (Rocambole)
 1913: Les Pauvres de Paris
 1913: Les Exploits de Rocambole (Le Nouveau Rocambole)
 1913: Joséphine vendue par ses sœurs
 1913: Jeanne la maudite
 1913: L'Enfant de la folle
 1913: Le Ruisseau
 1913: Le Roman d'un jeune homme pauvre
 1914: Rocambole et l'héritage du Marquis de Morfontaine
 1914: Marie-Jeanne ou la femme du peuple
 1914: La Douleur d'aimer
 1915: La Guerre du feu
 1916: Le Rêve d'Yvonne
 1916: La Joueuse d'orgue
 1916: Le Médecin des enfants
 1916: Le Coffre-fort
 1917: Le Geste
 1917: Son fils
 1917: Le Secret de la comtesse
 1917: 48, avenue de l'Opéra
 1917: La Comtesse de Somerive
 1918: Les Grands
 1918: André Cornélis
 1919: L'Argent qui tue

Filmography (as actor)
 1920: L'Hirondelle et la Mésange
 1939: La Fin du jour

See also
Louis Feuillade

References

External links
Mike Grost. Louis Feuillade: Influence on Fritz Lang

1865 births
1944 deaths
Male actors from Paris
French male film actors
French male silent film actors
French film directors
Silent film directors
20th-century French male actors